Craig Stephen King (born February 4, 1953) is an American lawyer who served as General Counsel of the Navy from 1989 to 1993.

Early life and education
King was born in American Fork, Utah on February 4, 1953. He attended Brigham Young University, graduating with a B.A. in April 1977. He then attended the Georgetown University Law Center, receiving a Juris Doctor in May 1980.

Career 
After graduating from law school, King became an associate attorney in the Washington, D.C. office of Dewey Ballantine. In 1989, he moved to the Washington, D.C. office of Sidley Austin. King's practice focused on antitrust counseling and litigation. An active member of the Republican Party, King served as Director of Survey Research for Ronald Reagan's re-election campaign in 1984 and was a senior advisor to the George H. W. Bush 1988 presidential campaign.

On August 24, 1989, George H. W. Bush nominated King as General Counsel of the Navy. After Senate confirmation, King held this office from November 22, 1989 until January 20, 1993.

Upon leaving the United States Department of the Navy, King joined Arent Fox as a partner, where his practice focuses on government contracts and grants.

References

1953 births
Living people
People from American Fork, Utah
Brigham Young University alumni
Georgetown University Law Center alumni
Utah Republicans
General Counsels of the United States Navy
George H. W. Bush administration personnel